Mastakan may refer to:
 Mastakan, Beradust
 Mastakan, Sumay-ye Shomali